The 2011 Jelajah Malaysia, a cycling stage race that took place in Malaysia. It was held from 8 to 13 March 2011. There were six stages with a total of 1,011 kilometres. In fact, the race was sanctioned by the Union Cycliste Internationale as a 2.2 category race and was part of the 2010–11 UCI Asia Tour calendar.

Mehdi Sohrabi of Iran won the race, followed by David McCann of Ireland second and Ioannis Tamouridis of Greece third overall. Mohamed Harrif Salleh of Malaysia won the points classification and Adiq Husainie Othman of Malaysia won the mountains classification.  won the team classification.

Stages

Classification leadership

Final standings

General classification

Points classification

Mountains classification

Team classification

Asian rider classification

Asian team classification

Malaysian rider classification

Malaysian team classification

Stage results

Stage 1
8 March 2011 — Kota Iskandar to Bandar Penawar,

Stage 2
9 March 2011 — Bandar Penawar to Kluang,

Stage 3
10 March 2011 — Kluang to Kuala Rompin,

Stage 4
11 March 2011 — Kuala Rompin to Pekan,

Stage 5
12 March 2011 — Pekan to Bentong,

Stage 6
8 March 2011 — Batu Caves to Nilai,

List of teams and riders
A total of 28 teams were invited to participate in the 2011 Jelajah Malaysia. Out of 171 riders, a total of 109 riders made it to the finish in Nilai.

  David McCann
  Rico Rogers
  Jai Crawford
  Alex Coutts
  Ryan Sherlock
Aisan Racing Team
  Takeaki Ayabe
  Kenichi Suzuki
  Masahiro Shinagawa
  Kazuhiro Mori
  Yasuharu Nakajima
  Shinpei Fukuda

  Chau Dor Ming
  Clemens Fankhauser
  Matthias Friedemann
  Jaan Kirsipuu
  Mart Ojavee
  Christopher Williams

  Jonathan Lovelock
  Patrick Shaw
  Anthony Giacoppo
  Steele Von Hoff
  Nathan Haas
  Nathan Earle
Holy Brother Cycling Team
  Man Jianren
  Li Chao
  Wei Baoxin
  Zhao Yiming
  Jin Long
  Xu Junheng

  Jesse Anthony
  Marsh Cooper
  Michael Creed
  Jason Donald
  Daniel Holloway
  Reid Mumford

  Ng Yong Li
  Mohd Hafiz Rozli
  Mohd Shawal Mohd Shafee
  Evgeny Vakker
  Félix Vidal Celis Zabala
  Sam Witmitz

  Ghader Mizbani
  Hossein Askari
  Mehdi Sohrabi
  Markus Eibegger
  Behnam Khalilikhosroshahi
  Boris Shpilevsky
Team Eddy Merckx-Indeland
  Stefan Ganser
  Dirk Finders
  Alexander Schmitt
  Daniel Westmattelmann
  Luc Hagenaars
  David Kopp

SP Tableware
  Ioannis Tamouridis
  Christoph Springer
  Mark O'Brien
  Periklis Ilias
  Guillaume Pont

  Yusrizal Usoff
  Anuar Manan
  Motoi Nara
  Mohamed Harrif Salleh
  Mohd Shahrul Mat Amin
  Mohd Saufi Mat Senan
Vali ASR Kerman Team
  Jalil Eslami
  Mohammad Zangi Abadi
  Moezeddin Seyed-Rezaei
  Saeed Nateghi
  Amin Eslampour
  Hossein Nateghi
Brunei
  Muhammad Halid Sata
  Reduan Yusop
  Azmi Abd Hadzid
  Muhammad Nurhaimin Awang
  Faizal Ahmad
  Arbe Shadatul Farrani
Malaysia
  Ahmad Fakhrullah Alias
  Mohamad Akmal Amrun
  Adiq Husainie Othman
  Sarham Miswan
  Mohd Zulhilmie Afif Ahmad Zamri
  Mohd Al-Ghazali Abd. Hamid
Thailand
  Sarawut Sirironnachai
  Nawuti Lihongyu
  Thurakit Boonratanathanakorn
  Nattapon Jeebthaworn
  Okart Bualoi
  Jakapan Ruanpae
Uzbekistan
  Muradjan Khalmuratov
  Vadim Shaekhov
  Yusup Abrekov
  Abdullojon Akparov
  Vladimir Tuychiev
  Gleb Gorbachev
7 Eleven Racing Team By RoadBike Philippines
  Lloyd Lucien Reynante
  Tomaz Matinez
  Ericson Obosa
  Mark John Lexer Galedo
  Irish Valenzuela
  Toots Oledan

FELDA-T Cycling Team
  Khairul Anuar Ibrahim
  Muhamad Harif Muralis
  Muhammad Zulhilmie Ahmad Zamri
  Mohd Syairazy Mohamad Puad
  Mohd Fahmi Irfan Mohd Zailani
  Muhamad Khairul Azizi Abdullah
Johor
  Mohd Firdaus Daud
  Mohd Fakhruddin Daud
  Muhamad Rizal Muhamad
  Mohd Shahelmie Abd Karim
  Matthew Chong Soon Leong
  Shaiful Ahmad
Malaysian Armed Forces
  Mohd Nur Rizuan Zainal
  Mohamed Zamri Salleh
  Mohd Shahrul Afiza Fauizan
  Mohd Fadhli Anwar Mohd Fauzi
  Mohd Shahrul Nizam Che Shamsudin
  Mohd Hazwan Azeman
Maramnde 47-F2P Team
  Jean Mespoulede
  Maxime Martin
  Jonathan Mouchel
  Sylvain Pandele
  Florent Sentuco
  Yohan Baudrit
Negeri Sembilan
  Mohamad Fairet Rusli
  Amirul Anuar Jefri
  Mohd Ekbar Zamanhuri
  Abdul Rashid Ibrahim
  Wan Shazwan Afiq Wan Shahril Anuar
  Mohd Nurshafiq Suhaimi
OCBC Singapore Continental Cycling Team
  Ang Kee Meng
  Ho Jun Rong
  Calvin Sim
  Marcus Leong
  Junaidi Hashim
  Adi Putera Yusoff

Pahang
  Mohamad Aim Mohamad Fauzi
  Mohd Yazrul Hisham Zulkifli
  Mohd Saifullah Jamal Alias
  Wan Ahmad Zarif Wan Abdul Halim
  Mohamad Faris Moher Affendy
  Muhamad Ayub Mohd Radzi
Royal Malaysia Police
  Amir Rusli
  Mohd Fauzan Ahmad Lutfi
  Salahuddin Mat Saman
  Mohd Faris Abdul Razak
  Nik Mohd Azwan Zulfikle
  Ahmad Huzairi Abu Bakar
Polygon Sweet Nice
  Herwin Jaya
  Jimmy Pranata
  Antonius Christopher Tjondrokusumo
  Dani Lesmana
  Bambang Suriyadi
  Serguei Kudentsov
Pusat Sukan Tumpuan Berbasikal KPT-UTEM Cycling Team
  Gan Hock Seng
  Muhammad Amin Amiruddin
  Mohd Sayuti Mohd Zahit
  Amirrudin Jamaluddin
  Mohammad Zaki Ramlee
  Mohammad Amirul Mohamed Ali
Sabah
  Raijesy Ryner R. Anang
  Abdul Rahman Abu Hasan
  Khairul Naim Azhar
  Shahrizan Selamat
Customs Cycling Club
  Erik Suprianto
  Fajar Mulia Ramli
  Iwan Setiawan
  Heksa Priya Prasetya
  Hartono Gunawan
  Muhamad Nur Fatoni
Kuala Lumpur
  Suhardi Hassan
  Ahmad Fallanie Ali
  Wan Mohd Najmee Wan Mohamad
  Nazri Mohamad
  Mohd Shafari Abdul Malik
  Loh Sea Keong

External links
 
 Palmares at cyclingarchives.com
 Results at cqranking.com

Jelajah Malaysia
Jelajah Malaysia
Jelajah Malaysia, 2011